Steven Krauzer was a ghostwriter for The Executioner series featuring Mack Bolan. He wrote a total of 4 books between 1982 and 1983. Krauzer was preceded by Saul Wernick and was followed by Michael Newton.

The Executioner 
 #40: Double Crossfire
 #44: Terrorist Summit
 #47: Renegade Agent
 #50: Brothers in Blood

References 

Year of birth missing (living people)
Living people
20th-century American novelists
American male novelists
20th-century American male writers